Mobasseri is a surname, originating from the Azerbaijan-region of Iran. The oldest known person from Mobasseri family with traceable documentation was "Ahmad", he used to be one of the known large land owners in Azerbaijan in the 19th and 20th century and was given the title of "Mobasser-Almolk" by Mozafferreddin Shah of Persia (Qajar dynasty) in the 19th century; Almolk literally means property or real estate. 

Ahmad Mobasseri believed the name to originate from the "Maleki" clan of Azerbaijani merchants, who chose the last name "Mobasseri" because of the title that the king of the time had given him.

See also 

Persian Kings
Cities of Iran

References
"Niakaan Faramoosh Shodeh" by Azar Mobasseri

Persian-language surnames
Azerbaijani-language surnames